The Ministry of Defense is a cabinet-level office in charge of defense-related matters of Ethiopia. It oversees the Ethiopian National Defense Force and Ethiopian Defense Industry. The current minister is Abraham Belay.

History
This institution can trace its origins back to the Ministry of War, which Emperor Menelik II established in 1907, and made Fitawrari Habte Giyorgis Minister over it. Emperor Haile Selassie re-established the Ministry of War in 1942, making Ras Abebe Aregai its Minister. The Ministry is headed by a civilian minister which is a requirement of Article 87 of the current constitution of Ethiopia. It was established 23 August 1995 with the passing of Proclamation 4/1995, which also established the other 14 Ministries.

On 9 January 2022, a new building of the Ministry of Defense was inaugurated. The five floor building of more than 700 offices and facilities serves now as the headquarters of the ministry, and is located on 13 hectares of land in Addis Ababa.

List of ministers

Minister of War/Defence of the Ethiopian Empire

Minister of Defense of Socialist Ethiopia

Minister of Defense of the Federal Democratic Republic of Ethiopia (1991-present)

See also 
 DAVEC

References

Citations

Bibliography
 
 

Defense
Ethiopia
Defense